Muhammed Emin Yıldız (born 14 June 1995) is a Turkish taekwondo athlete.

Career 
In 2018, Muhammed Emin Yıldız won the silver medals in 74 kg at the 2018 European Taekwondo Championships held in Kazan, Russia.

In 2022, he won one of the bronze medals in 74 kg at the 2022 European Taekwondo Championships held in Manchester, England.

References

External links 

Living people
1995 births
Turkish male taekwondo practitioners
European Taekwondo Championships medalists
Islamic Solidarity Games medalists in taekwondo
Islamic Solidarity Games competitors for Turkey
21st-century Turkish people